Streptomyces lopnurensis is a bacterium species from the genus of Streptomyces which has been isolated from soil from Lop Nur in the Xinjiang Province in China.

See also 
 List of Streptomyces species

References

Further reading

External links
Type strain of Streptomyces lopnurensis at BacDive -  the Bacterial Diversity Metadatabase	

lopnurensis
Bacteria described in 2014